commonly abbreviated as Nintendo EPD, is the largest division within the Japanese video game company Nintendo. The division focuses on developing and producing video games, mobile apps, and other related entertainment software for the company. EPD was created after merging their Entertainment Analysis & Development (EAD) and Software Planning & Development (SPD) divisions in September 2015.

History 

The division was created on September 16, 2015, after the consolidation of two of Nintendo's former software divisions, Entertainment Analysis & Development (EAD) and Software Planning & Development (SPD), as part of a company-wide organizational restructure that took place under Nintendo's then newly appointed president, Tatsumi Kimishima.

The division assumed both of its predecessors' roles, focusing on the development of games and software for Nintendo platforms and mobile devices; it also manages and licenses the company's various intellectual properties, alongside producing and supervising development for external studios. Shinya Takahashi, former head of Nintendo SPD, serves as the general manager of the division, with Yoshiaki Koizumi, Katsuya Eguchi, Eiji Aonuma, and Hisashi Nogami serving as deputy general managers, and, Kensuke Tanabe, Yoshio Sakamoto and Takashi Tezuka acting as senior officers. While the others were in such positions since the division's formation, Aonuma, Tanabe and Nogami were promoted into higher positions within the division in 2019.

Development

Notes

References

First-party video game developers
Nintendo divisions and subsidiaries
Video game development companies
Video game companies established in 2015
Japanese companies established in 2015
Companies based in Kyoto